DXWT (92.3 FM), broadcasting as 92.3 Wild FM, is a radio station owned and operated by the UM Broadcasting Network. It serves as the flagship station of the Wild FM network. The station's studio is located at the UMBN Media Center, C. Bangoy cor. Palma Gil St., Davao City, and its transmitter is located along Broadcast Ave., Shrine Hills, Matina, Davao City.

History

1949–1988: DXMC
In 1949, businessman Atty. Guillermo Torres founded the first radio station in Mindanao and in Davao City under the callsign DXMC, named after Mindanao Colleges and was originally broadcast at 740 kilocycles. Back then, it broadcasts news and music programming.

In 1957, Torres founded the University of Mindanao Broadcasting Network after its Congressional franchise was amended. The station was shut down during Martial Law, but resumed its operations alongside DXUM but not DXMM.

In November 1978, due to the switch of the Philippine AM dial from the NARBA-mandated 10 kHz spacing to the 9 kHz rule implemented by the Geneva Frequency Plan of 1975, the station's frequency was transferred to 819 kHz.

1988–present: DXWT
In July 1988, about 2 years after the "EDSA People Power Revolution", DXMC migrated into the FM frequency under the callsign DXWT and became known as 92.3 WT. After a few years, UMBN launched a new FM brand now known as Wild FM.

Under the leadership of Willie Torres, DXWT was formatted as dance-leaning Contemporary Hit Radio (CHR), capitalizing on Dance Re-Mixes and the so-called EPs (Extended Play), normally played only in Disco Clubs. Wild FM transformed radio programming by putting these re-mixes and EPs in 20-minute un-interrupted non-stop sweeps over the airwaves. Wild FM also revolutionized radio promotions and events by organizing Street Discos and Disco sa Barangays. In less than a year, Wild FM became no. 1 in Davao City, and a by-word in the industry.

During the early 2000s, it slowly shifted to masa market. In 2009, the station changed its branding to Wild 92.3 WT. In 2010, it became the first radio station in Mindanao to begin broadcasting via its HD Radio technology. Today, Wild FM remains a vital force in the industry, enjoying the steady support of both the listeners and advertisers, as Mindanao's dance outlet.

In July 2018, as part of their 30th anniversary, the station reverted to its Wild FM brand.

References

External links
Wild 92.3 WT Website

Wild FM Davao
Rhythmic contemporary radio stations in the Philippines
Radio stations established in 1988